Stany  is a village in the administrative district of Gmina Przystajń, within Kłobuck County, Silesian Voivodeship, in southern Poland.

The village has a population of 173.

References

Stany